The Riverkeepers: Two Activists Fight to Reclaim Our Environment as a Basic Human Right (1997) is an academic work by John Cronin and Robert F. Kennedy, Jr., with the foreword by Al Gore.

Summary

Publication
New York, NY : Scribner, c1997,

Web site 
 Riverkeeper.org

1997 in the environment
Environmental non-fiction books